Hreiðar Levy Guðmundsson (born 29 November 1980) is an Icelandic handball player who currently plays for Íþróttafélagið Grótta in Iceland.  He was part of the Icelandic team that won the silver medal at the 2008 Summer Olympics.

External links
 Hreiðar Guðmundssons profile at www.tvemsdetten.com

1980 births
Living people
Hreidar Gudmundsson
Handball players at the 2008 Summer Olympics
Handball players at the 2012 Summer Olympics
Hreidar Gudmundsson
Hreidar Gudmundsson
Recipients of the Order of the Falcon
Olympic medalists in handball
Medalists at the 2008 Summer Olympics
Hreidar Gudmundsson